Nello Donald Falaschi (March 19, 1913 – July 29, 1986) was an American football player in the National Football League for the New York Giants.  He was inducted into the College Football Hall of Fame in 1971.

Early life
Falaschi was born in Dos Palos, California and played high school football at Bellarmine College Preparatory in San Jose, California.

College career
After high school, Falaschi attended and played college football at Santa Clara University, where he played quarterback.  While there, he led them to a victory in the 1937 Sugar Bowl and was named an All-American.

Professional career
Falaschi was drafted in the second round of the 1937 NFL Draft by the Washington Redskins, but played his entire professional career with the New York Giants, where he was named to three Pro Bowls.

After football
After retiring, Falaschi established a construction company in Oakland, California.

References

External links
 

1913 births
1986 deaths
American football quarterbacks
New York Giants players
Saint Mary's Pre-Flight Air Devils football players
Santa Clara Broncos football players
College Football Hall of Fame inductees
People from Merced County, California
Players of American football from San Jose, California